Koca Mehmet Ragıp Pasha (1698–1763) was an Ottoman statesman who served as a civil servant before 1744 as the provincial governor of Egypt from 1744 to 1748 and Grand Vizier from 1757 to 1763. He was also known as a poet. His epithet Koca means "great" or "giant" in Turkish.

Early years
His father was Şevki Mustafa, a bureaucrat in the Ottoman Empire. After completing his education, Mehmet Ragıp worked in various parts of the empire as a civil servant. He served as the chief treasurer in Baghdad (then a part of the Ottoman Empire). He was a member of Ottoman representatives in the Treaty of Belgrade in 1739. He was promoted to the post of reis ül-küttab (equivalent to a modern foreign minister) in 1740. He was the governor of Ottoman Egypt from 1744 to 1748, when he was forced to step down by local troops.

As Grand Vizier

He was appointed as Grand Vizier on 12 January 1757 by the sultan Osman III. When Osman III died ten months later, Mehmet Ragıp Pasha continued under the new sultan Mustafa III with whom he had very good relations. He married Saliha, the sultan's sister, and gained the title damat.

Ragıp's term was during an Ottoman decline. He nevertheless enacted reforms to Ottoman administration and treasury. For the first time Ottoman revenues exceed expenditures. He was an adherent of peace policy. His term in the office almost coincides with the Seven Years' War in Europe (1756-1763). Despite the danger of war, he was able to keep the Ottoman Empire out of conflict. Upon his death, Mustafa III wrote an elegy expressing his sorrow for his good friend.

See also
 List of Ottoman Grand Viziers
 List of Ottoman governors of Egypt

References

1698 births
1763 deaths
18th-century Grand Viziers of the Ottoman Empire
18th-century Ottoman governors of Egypt
Turks from the Ottoman Empire
Reis ül-Küttab
Damats
Politicians from Istanbul
Ottoman governors of Egypt